Leak or Leaks is the surname of:

Leak:
 Bill Leak (1956–2017), Australian cartoonist and painter
 Bill Leak (sportsman) (1917–2007), Australian rules footballer and cricketer
 Bruce Leak, American inventor and entrepreneur
 Chris Leak (born 1985), American former football quarterback
 Hector Leak (1887–1976), British statistician
 James Leak, 19th century English bare-knuckle prize fighter
 John Leak (1892–1972), Australian First World War recipient of the Victoria Cross
 Maysa Leak (born 1966), American jazz singer better known simply as Maysa

Leaks:
 Manny Leaks (born 1945), American Basketball Association and National Basketball Association player
 Roosevelt Leaks (born 1953), African-American college football and National Football League player, member of the College Football Hall of Fame

See also
 Leek (surname)